The 2020–21 LEN Euro Cup was the 29th edition of the second-tier European tournament for  men's water polo clubs.

Teams
The labels in the parentheses show how each team qualified for the place of its starting round:
The labels in the parentheses show how each team qualified for the place of its starting round:
CL: Transferred from the LEN Champions League
Q: Losers from the qualifying round

Schedule
The schedule of the competition is as follows.

Qualification round

The qualification round is scheduled for 4–6 December 2020.

Group A

Group B

Group C

Group D

Group E

Group F

Group G

Group F

Knockout phase

Bracket

Eight Finals

Quarter-finals

Semi-finals

Finals

See also
2020–21 LEN Champions League

References

Notes

External links
, len.microplustiming.com

 
2020
2020 in water polo
2021 in water polo
LEN Euro Cup
LEN Euro Cup